Okpo may refer to:

Okpho, town in Myanmar
 Okpho Township, whose seat is Okpho
Okpo, Madaya, Myanmar
Okpo-dong -South Korea